Addalaichenai Central College or Addalaichenai Madya Maha Vidyalaya is a National School situated in Ampara District, Addalaichenai. Which was founded on 1912.

History 
Addalaichenai Central College is situated in Addalaichenai in Ampara district.

The institution was founded on January 7, 1912 as the first Government school on the east coast of the island under the scheme of establishing Government schools throughout the island. In the beginning the school functioned in a 20 foot × 40 foot hut thatched with acadians with a headmaster, C.G. Vairamuththu, and an assistant teacher. Student from religions such as Muslim, Hindus and Christians studied there.

Its name was changed to "Sathana school" in 1942 and then as "Mahavidyalaya" as a result of late Pottuvil electorate MP Dr. M.A.M.Jalaldeen's effort. He provided the college with physical resources such a buildings, science laboratory water tanks, etc.

The leader of Sri Lanka Muslim Congress ( SLMC ) late minister, M.H.M. Asraff helped the college to establish new buildings and reconstruct previous resources to mark the "National Meeladun Nabi Ceremony" held in the school for the first time in the eastern province in 1997. The institution was upgraded to the status of National School in the same year.

The school now has over two thousand five hundred students and 110 teachers. In addition, there are over 15 buildings including five three story buildings, one, two storied building one well equipped modern science laboratory. Meelad hall (assembly hall) agriculture room, and science room.

Past Principals 
1	Mr.C.G.Viramuththu
2	Mr. S.S. Nahappar
3	Mr. V. Rajarathnam
4	Mr.K.Veerakon
5	Mr. Arulaiya
6	Mr.V.Paranirupasingham
7	Mr.M. Peethamparam
8	Mr.K.Vadivel
9	Mr.S.H.L.Ibrahim
10	Mr.J.M. Samsudeen Moulana
11	Mr. M.I.M.Naheem
12	Mr.A.M. Abdul Kuthoose
13	Mr.P.M. Abdul Kader
14	Mr. M.A.M.Samsudeen
15	Mr.A.L.M.Abdul Cader
16	Mr.A.Ahamed Lebbe
17	Mr.J.M. Samsudeen Moulana
18	Mr.M.A.Mohideen Bawa
19	Mr.B.M.Kamaldeen
20	Mr.M.L.M.Baseer
21	Mr.A.R.A.Azeez
22	Mr.M.A.Umar Lebbe
23	Mr.M.A.Uthuma Lebbe
24	Mr.A.M.Abdul Gafoor
25	Mr.M.I.M.Hai
26	Mr. U.L.Mohideen
27	Mr.Y.M.S.Y.Moulana
28	Mr.M.H.M.Naleem
29	Mr.U.M.Shaheed
30	Mr.P.M.M.A.Gaffoor
31	Mr.A.L.M.Sakariya
32	Mr.K.L.Abdul Majeed
33	Mr.M.H.M.Naleem
34	Mr.A.C.Saifudeen
35  Mr.M.M.Anwar   
36  Mr.A.L.Kamurudeen 
37 Mr.M.S.Nafar  
38 Mr.A.C.M.Haris

References

Schools in Ampara District